The women's quadrant regu sepak takraw competition at the 2018 Asian Games was held at Ranau Sports Hall, Palembang, Indonesia from 28 August to 1 September. Women's quadrant competition was held for the first time in the Asian Games history.

Squads

Results
All times are Western Indonesia Time (UTC+07:00)

Preliminary

Group A

|-

|-
|28 August||13:00
|align=right|
|align=center|2–0
|align=left|
|21–19||21–13||
|-

|-
|28 August||13:00
|align=right|
|align=center|2–1
|align=left|
|21–15||19–21||21–18
|-

|-
|29 August||11:00
|align=right|
|align=center|2–0
|align=left|
|22–20||21–17||
|-

|-
|29 August||11:00
|align=right|
|align=center|2–1
|align=left|
|21–19||20–22||21–14
|-

|-
|29 August||16:30
|align=right|
|align=center|0–2
|align=left|
|12–21||20–22||
|-

|-
|29 August||16:30
|align=right|
|align=center|2–0
|align=left|
|21–7||21–16||
|-

Group B

|-

|-
|28 August||14:00
|align=right|
|align=center|2–0
|align=left|
|21–7||21–10||
|-

|-
|28 August||14:00
|align=right|
|align=center|2–0
|align=left|
|21–12||21–8||
|-

|-
|29 August||10:00
|align=right|
|align=center|2–0
|align=left|
|21–18||21–13||
|-

|-
|29 August||10:00
|align=right|
|align=center|0–2
|align=left|
|13–21||9–21||
|-

|-
|29 August||15:30
|align=right|
|align=center|0–2
|align=left|
|18–21||17–21||
|-

|-
|29 August||15:30
|align=right|
|align=center|2–0
|align=left|
|21–6||21–12||
|-

|-
|30 August||12:30
|align=right|
|align=center|2–0
|align=left|
|21–11||21–15||
|-

|-
|30 August||12:30
|align=right|
|align=center|2–0
|align=left|
|21–10||21–13||
|-

|-
|30 August||16:30
|align=right|
|align=center|2–0
|align=left|
|21–7||21–6||
|-

|-
|30 August||16:30
|align=right|
|align=center|1–2
|align=left|
|21–19||12–21||18–21
|-

Knockout round

Semifinals

|-
|31 August||14:00
|align=right|
|align=center|1–2
|align=left|
|20–22||21–15||19–21
|-
|31 August||14:00
|align=right|
|align=center|2–0
|align=left|
|21–17||25–24||
|-

Gold medal match

|-
|1 September||10:00
|align=right|
|align=center|0–2
|align=left|
|8–21||10–21||
|-

References

External links
Sepak takraw at the 2018 Asian Games

Sepak takraw at the 2018 Asian Games